Stephen Wilson Bethel (born February 24, 1984) is an American actor and producer. He is known for his roles as Wade Kinsella on Hart of Dixie, as Ryder Callahan on the CBS daytime soap opera The Young and the Restless, Deputy district attorney Mark Callan on the legal drama All Rise, and as Agent Benjamin “Dex” Poindexter on the Netflix original series Daredevil. He is also the star and creator of the web series Stupid Hype on the CW's online platform CWD (CW Digital Studio).

Personal life 
Bethel was born on February 24, 1984, in Hillsborough, New Hampshire. He is the son of artist Steve Bethel and author Joyce Maynard. He married Liesl Martinez-Balaguer on November 28, 2020. Bethel is Jewish. He has one daughter.

Career 
Bethel made his on-screen debut as Brad in the teen drama series The O.C., in the episode "The Telenovela". He had guest roles in JAG, Cold Case, and NCIS, and portrayed Corporal Evan "Q-Tip" Stafford in the Emmy-nominated mini-series Generation Kill, starring Alexander Skarsgård. Bethel made his film debut in the 2008 Vietnam War film, 1968 Tunnel Rats where he played the Army Special Ops soldier, Corporal Green. In 2009, he landed a recurring role as Ryder Callahan on the CBS daytime soap opera The Young and the Restless.

In The CW's comedy-drama series Hart of Dixie, Bethel played Wade Kinsella, "bad-boy" neighbor to the series' central character, Zoe Hart. Production for the show began in early 2011 and it premiered on September 26, 2011. The series concluded on May 7, 2015, after four seasons. BuddyTV ranked him #14 on its list of "TV's Sexiest Men of 2011"; in 2012 he was ranked #2 on the same list. He appeared in four episodes of ABC's legal thriller series How to Get Away with Murder as Charles Mahoney.

In 2017, he joined the Roundabout Theatre Company's production of The Last Match, which was set in the world of professional tennis. In 2018, he joined the cast of Daredevil as Benjamin "Dex" Poindexter, a composite character of Bullseye and Nuke. In 2019, Bethel landed a main role on the CBS legal drama series All Rise as Deputy District Attorney Mark Callan.

Filmography

Film

Television

References

External links
 
 

21st-century American male actors
Male actors from New Hampshire
American male film actors
American people of Canadian descent
American people of English descent
American people of Russian-Jewish descent
American male soap opera actors
American male television actors
Living people
People from Hillsborough, New Hampshire
1984 births